Julien Sprunger (born January 4, 1986) is a Swiss professional ice hockey player who currently serves as captain of HC Fribourg-Gottéron in the National League (NL). He was selected by the Minnesota Wild in the 4th round (117th overall) of the 2004 NHL Entry Draft.

Career statistics

Regular season and playoffs

International

External links

1986 births
Living people
HC Fribourg-Gottéron players
HC La Chaux-de-Fonds players
Ice hockey players at the 2010 Winter Olympics
Olympic ice hockey players of Switzerland
Minnesota Wild draft picks
Swiss ice hockey right wingers
People from Fribourg
Sportspeople from the canton of Fribourg